Gene Codes Corporation is a privately owned international firm based in Ann Arbor, Michigan, which specializes in bioinformatics software for genetic sequence analysis.   Its flagship software product, Sequencher, is a sequencing software used throughout the world. Its targeted use is by researchers at academic and government labs as well as biotechnology and pharmaceutical companies for DNA sequence assembly.

History 
Gene Codes Corporation was founded in 1988 in Ann Arbor, Michigan. In 1991, the DNA sequence assembly and analysis software, Sequencher, was released. By 1997, nearly every major pharmaceutical company and commercial genomics company in the world was standardized on Sequencher, as well as the majority of labs at major academic centers. Sequencher 5.4 was released in 2015.

Sequencher 

Sequencher 5.1 has the ability to perform Sanger Sequencing and Next Generation Sequencing. It has advanced tools that aid in the general analysis of sequences and create reports that are an in depth analysis within customer data set.   

General Analysis
 Reference sequence alignment
 Variance Table 
 Extensive import and export capabilities
 NCBI BLAST Search 

Sanger Sequencing
 Import data from any of the major CE instruments 
 Clean up raw data by trimming vectors low quality bases
 Perform alignment de novo or reference based assembly with flexible 
 Move easily between aligned data files analyze traces locally or globally to find secondary or uncalled peaks. 
 Instantly move between raw sequence multi-frame translation and restriction maps
 Set up reusable templates for common projects letting you use base numbering and features from the reference sequence to annotate new alignments
 Compare similar projects using a variance table
 Advanced powerful tools to detect mutations and SNPs and refer back to raw data to eliminate sequencing artifacts
 Generate reports that quickly and clearly document research findings

Next-Generation Sequencing
 Easily import NGS reads 
 Choose either Maq or GSNAP as your alignment algorithm 
 View results using Tablet 
 SNP analysis and Methylation studies

Awards 

 The International Society for Computational Biology recognizes Howard Cash and Gene Codes Forensics for the unique application of computational biology to help with disaster victim identification. ISCB President Michael Gribskov called Gene Codes' contribution "unique, valuable, and beyond the limit of what could be expected".
 Ann Arbor IT Zone recognizes Gene Codes Corporation with the Indestructible Award for Growth and Achievement.
 Gene Codes is awarded the Merlanti Prize for Best Practices in Business Ethics.
 Genome Technology makes Howard Cash Person of the Year in their All-Star Awards.
 Gene Codes Corporation is named one of the Future 50 of Greater Detroit: "In recognition of your outstanding contribution to Metropolitan Detroit through sales and employment growth."
 Ernst & Young and The New Enterprise Forum name Howard Cash, President, CEO and founder of Gene Codes, Entrepreneur of the Year.
 Gene Codes wins the Washtenaw County Fast Track Award.
 Sequencher receives the Best DNA Sequence Assembly Product from the Biotechnology Software & Internet Journal.
 Gene Codes receives Michigan Leading Edge Technology Award in the biotechnology category. The award recognizes innovations introduced with Sequencher version 3.0, giving special mention to enhancements that allowed increased process automation.
 Gene Codes receives the Best Presentation of the Year award by the Michigan Branch of the New Enterprise Forum: "In recognition of an innovative business venture which has helped make Gene Codes Corporation a model entrepreneurial firm."

References 

 Thomas D. Wu and Serban Nacu, Fast and SNP-tolerant detection of complex variants and splicing in short reads, Bioinformatics 2010 26: 873-881
 Heng Li, Jue Ruan and Richard Durbin, Mapping short DNA sequencing reads and calling variants using mapping quality scores, Genome Research 2008 18:1851-1858
 Ian Milne, Micha Bayer, Linda Cardle, Paul Shaw, Gordon Stephen, Frank Wright and David Marshall, Tablet next generation sequence assembly visualization, BioInformatics 2010 26: 40-402

External links 

 Demo Download of Sequencher
 Training/ Tutorials, For scientists wanting any help learning the various features of Sequencher, a number of helpful tutorials are available.

Bioinformatics companies
DNA